Paul Crosbie (born 25 November 1976) is a football player and manager who manages English non-league team Huntingdon Town.

Football career

Managerial
Crosbie was a community football coach for Wimbledon between 1998 and 2003 but was made redundant due to the club's financial position. When unemployed, he found a job opening on the internet for the Technical Director position at the Turks and Caicos Islands Football Association, two weeks after first hearing of the Islands at the 2002 Commonwealth Games.

Crosbie became manager of the Turks and Caicos Islands national team in August 2003.

In June 2012, Crosbie became manager of English non-league team March Town United and he joined the Huntingdon Town coaching staff in June 2016.

Playing
He made four international appearances for Turks and Caicos Islands between 2004 and 2006, appearing in two 2006 FIFA World Cup qualifying matches for them.

References

1976 births
Living people
Footballers from Dumfries
Scottish expatriate sportspeople in the Turks and Caicos Islands
Association football midfielders
Scottish footballers
Turks and Caicos Islands footballers
Turks and Caicos Islands international footballers
Expatriate footballers in the Turks and Caicos Islands
Scottish football managers
Turks and Caicos Islands national football team managers
Expatriate football managers in the Turks and Caicos Islands
Wimbledon F.C. non-playing staff
Association football coaches